Hollywood Casino Amphitheatre (originally World Music Theatre and formerly New World Music Theatre, Tweeter Center and First Midwest Bank Amphitheatre) is an outdoor music venue located in Tinley Park, Illinois, that opened in 1990 and was built by Gierczyk Development. It is one of the largest music venues in the Chicago area, with a capacity of up to 28,000 spectators: 11,000 reserved seats and 17,000 lawn seats.

It is a venue pulling fans from the city of Chicago, as well as surrounding suburbs and neighboring states. It is one of only a few large outdoor amphitheatres in the Chicago area.

Nederlander Concerts and Jam Productions co-managed the venue from 1994 to 1999.

Hollywood Casino acquired the naming rights, beginning in 2015. The venue is owned by Live Nation.

Concerts and music festivals

The venue has hosted many concerts and music festivals, including All That! Music and More Festival, Anger Management Tour, Area Festival, B96 Pepsi SummerBash, Crüe Fest, Crüe Fest 2, Curiosa Festival, Family Values Tour, Farm Aid, Furthur Festival, Gigantour, The Grateful Dead, H.O.R.D.E. Festival, Honda Civic Tour, Lilith Fair, Lollapalooza, Mayhem Festival, Ozzfest, Projekt Revolution, Rock the Bells Festival, Uproar Festival, Vans Warped Tour and WKQX Q101.1's Jamboree.

Cher was the very first entertainer to perform at the venue – it was barely completed then – during her Heart of Stone Tour on June 2, 1990.

Kiss headlined the venue's second day of operation on their Hot in The Shade Tour on June 3, 1990.

Depeche Mode performed two consecutive shows during their World Violation Tour on July 2–3, 1990, with Nitzer Ebb as their opening act. Live footage shot by longtime collaborator Anton Corbijn was used for the official music video to their song "World in My Eyes".

The Grateful Dead show on July 23, 1990, was the last show that keyboard player Brent Mydland played before his death three days later.

Bon Jovi played at the venue during their I'll Sleep When I'm Dead Tour on July 24, 1993 and as part of their These Days Tour on August 12, 1995.

The Spice Girls performed a sold-out show on July 27, 1998 as part of their Spiceworld Tour.

Bob Dylan and Paul Simon performed here during their Never Ending Tour on July 9, 1999.

Phish performed during their Rift Tour on August 14, 1993, the show was recorded and later released, as Live Phish Volume 7, on April 16, 2002.

Rush performed during their Test for Echo Tour on June 14, 1997. Much of this show was featured on their live album, entitled Different Stages, released on November 10, 1998.

Disturbed performed during Q101.1's 2001 Jamboree; they used live footage of their song "Down with the Sickness" for its official music video.

Fall Out Boy and Paramore performed during their co-headlining Monumentour on July 11, 2014, with The New Politics as their opening act. Paramore used live footage from this show in the music video for their new song "Last Hope". Fall Out Boy returned on July 11, 2015, this time on tour with rapper Wiz Khalifa.

See also
List of contemporary amphitheatres
Live Nation

References

External links
Official site

Amphitheaters in the United States
Music venues in Illinois
Tinley Park, Illinois